Lakehurst is a borough in Ocean County, New Jersey, United States. As of the 2010 United States Census, the borough's population was 2,654, reflecting an increase of 132 (+5.2%) from the 2,522 counted in the 2000 Census, which had in turn declined by 556 (−18.1%) from the 3,078 counted in the 1990 Census.

Lakehurst was incorporated as a borough by an act of the New Jersey Legislature on April 7, 1921, from portions of Manchester Township, based on the results of a referendum held on May 24, 1921. The borough is named for its location near lakes and woods.

History

The community of Lakehurst first reached international fame as a winter resort around the turn of the 20th century, following the opening of the Pine Tree Inn in 1898. In 1911, the rope factory in the town burned down, prompting the formation of a volunteer fire department.

The Hindenburg disaster, occurred on May 6, 1937; the German zeppelin Hindenburg arriving from Frankfurt am Main caught fire at the Lakehurst Naval Air Station, which is located in Manchester Township (not in the borough of Lakehurst).

Geography

According to the United States Census Bureau, the borough had a total area of 0.99 square miles (2.56 km2), including 0.90 square miles (2.32 km2) of land and 0.09 square miles (0.24 km2) of water (9.39%).

The borough's lake, Lake Horicon, existed prior to 1942, as clearly shown in aerial photographs from 1940 and 1931 and topographical maps from 1912. The cedar water lake remains stream-fed.

Lakehurst is completely surrounded by Manchester Township, making it part of 21 pairs of "doughnut towns" in the state, where one municipality entirely surrounds another.

The borough is one of 11 municipalities in Ocean County that are part of the Toms River watershed.

Climate
The climate in this area is characterized by hot, humid summers and generally mild to cool winters.  According to the Köppen Climate Classification system, Lakehurst has a humid subtropical climate, abbreviated "Cfa" on climate maps.

Demographics

Census 2010

The Census Bureau's 2006–2010 American Community Survey showed that (in 2010 inflation-adjusted dollars) median household income was $67,872 (with a margin of error of +/− $8,972) and the median family income was $67,838 (+/− $7,173). Males had a median income of $44,844 (+/− $8,788) versus $34,950 (+/− $7,557) for females. The per capita income for the borough was $27,171 (+/− $4,950). About 2.1% of families and 3.7% of the population were below the poverty line, including none of those under age 18 and 9.4% of those age 65 or over.

Census 2000

As of the 2000 United States Census there were 870 households (662 of which were families of two or more) in the borough making up the total population of 2,522. The racial makeup of the borough was 84.22% White, 7.85% African American, 0.63% Native American, 2.34% Asian, 0.08% Pacific Islander, 2.74% from other races, and 2.14% from two or more races. Hispanic or Latino of any race were 7.97% of the population.

There were 870 households, out of which 41.4% had children under the age of 18 living with them, 57.5% were married couples living together, 13.4% had a female householder with no husband present, and 23.9% were non-families. 19.8% of all households were made up of individuals, and 6.6% had someone living alone who was 65 years of age or older. The average household size was 2.90 and the average family size was 3.33.

In the borough the population was spread out, with 30.6% under the age of 18, 8.0% from 18 to 24, 34.1% from 25 to 44, 19.4% from 45 to 64, and 8.0% who were 65 years of age or older. The median age was 32 years. For every 100 females, there were 106.6 males. For every 100 females age 18 and over, there were 100.3 males.

The median income for a household in the borough was $43,567, and the median income for a family was $48,833. Males had a median income of $35,403 versus $26,667 for females. The per capita income for the borough was $18,390. About 4.4% of families and 7.1% of the population were below the poverty line, including 7.6% of those under age 18 and 2.5% of those age 65 or over.

Government

Local government
Lakehurst is governed under the Borough form of New Jersey municipal government, which is used in 218 municipalities (of the 564) statewide, making it the most common form of government in New Jersey. The governing body is comprised of the Mayor and the Borough Council, with all positions elected at-large on a partisan basis as part of the November general election. The Mayor is elected directly by the voters to a four-year term of office. The Borough Council is comprised of six members elected to serve three-year terms on a staggered basis, with two seats coming up for election each year in a three-year cycle. The Borough form of government used by Lakehurst is a "weak mayor / strong council" government in which council members act as the legislative body with the mayor presiding at meetings and voting only in the event of a tie. The mayor can veto ordinances subject to an override by a two-thirds majority vote of the council. The mayor makes committee and liaison assignments for council members, and most appointments are made by the mayor with the advice and consent of the council.

, the Mayor of Lakehurst Borough is Republican Harry Robbins, whose term of office ends December 31, 2023. Members of the Lakehurst Borough Council are Council President Steven Oglesby (R, 2022), James W. Davis Jr. (R, 2024), Bernadette Dugan (R, 2024; appointed to serve an unexpired term), Brian C. DiMeo (R, 2022), Patricia A. Hodges (R, 2023), Robert McCarthy (R, 2023).

In March 2022, the Borough Council appointed Bernadette Dugan to the seat expiring in December 2024 that had been held by Gary Lowe until he died in office the previous January, just weeks after having taken office. Dugan will serve on an interim basis until the November 2022 general election, when voters will choose a candidate to fill the balance of the term of office.

In August 2015, the Borough Council selected former mayor Stephen F. Childers to fill the unexpired term ending in December 2016 of Glenn McComas, who had resigned from office the previous month as he was moving out of the borough.

Federal, state and county representation
Lakehurst is located in the 4th Congressional District and is part of New Jersey's 10th state legislative district. Prior to the 2011 reapportionment following the 2010 Census, Lakehurst had been in the 9th state legislative district.

 

Ocean County is governed by a Board of County Commissioners comprised of five members who are elected on an at-large basis in partisan elections and serving staggered three-year terms of office, with either one or two seats coming up for election each year as part of the November general election. At an annual reorganization held in the beginning of January, the board chooses a Director and a Deputy Director from among its members. , Ocean County's Commissioners (with party affiliation, term-end year and residence) are:

Commissioner Director John P. Kelly (R, 2022, Eagleswood Township),
Commissioner Deputy Director Virginia E. Haines (R, 2022, Toms River),
Barbara Jo Crea (R, 2024, Little Egg Harbor Township)
Gary Quinn (R, 2024, Lacey Township) and
Joseph H. Vicari (R, 2023, Toms River). Constitutional officers elected on a countywide basis are 
County Clerk Scott M. Colabella (R, 2025, Barnegat Light),
Sheriff Michael G. Mastronardy (R, 2022; Toms River) and
Surrogate Jeffrey Moran (R, 2023, Beachwood).

Politics
As of March 23, 2011, there were a total of 1,373 registered voters in Lakehurst, of which 254 (18.5%) were registered as Democrats, 295 (21.5%) were registered as Republicans and 823 (59.9%) were registered as Unaffiliated. There was one voter registered to another party. Among the borough's 2010 Census population, 51.7% (vs. 63.2% in Ocean County) were registered to vote, including 72.2% of those ages 18 and over (vs. 82.6% countywide).

In the 2012 presidential election, Democrat Barack Obama received 50.8% of the vote (438 cast), ahead of Republican Mitt Romney with 48.5% (418 votes), and other candidates with 0.7% (6 votes), among the 872 ballots cast by the borough's 1,480 registered voters (10 ballots were spoiled), for a turnout of 58.9%. In the 2008 presidential election, Republican John McCain received 49.5% of the vote (459 cast), ahead of Democrat Barack Obama with 47.7% (443 votes) and other candidates with 1.7% (16 votes), among the 928 ballots cast by the borough's 1,521 registered voters, for a turnout of 61.0%. In the 2004 presidential election, Republican George W. Bush received 58.8% of the vote (518 ballots cast), outpolling Democrat John Kerry with 39.8% (351 votes) and other candidates with 0.8% (12 votes), among the 881 ballots cast by the borough's 1,427 registered voters, for a turnout percentage of 61.7.

In the 2013 gubernatorial election, Republican Chris Christie received 73.4% of the vote (398 cast), ahead of Democrat Barbara Buono with 25.1% (136 votes), and other candidates with 1.5% (8 votes), among the 555 ballots cast by the borough's 1,461 registered voters (13 ballots were spoiled), for a turnout of 38.0%. In the 2009 gubernatorial election, Republican Chris Christie received 65.0% of the vote (371 ballots cast), ahead of Democrat Jon Corzine with 25.4% (145 votes), Independent Chris Daggett with 7.4% (42 votes) and other candidates with 1.1% (6 votes), among the 571 ballots cast by the borough's 1,469 registered voters, yielding a 38.9% turnout.

Education

The Lakehurst School District serves students in public school for pre-kindergarten through eighth grade at Lakehurst Elementary School. As of the 2018–2019 school year, the district, comprised of one school, had an enrollment of 374 students and 35.1 classroom teachers (on an FTE basis), for a student–teacher ratio of 10.7:1.

Public school students from Lakehurst in ninth through twelfth grades attend Manchester Township High School in Manchester Township, as part of a sending/receiving relationship with the Manchester Township School District. As of the 2018–2019 school year, the high school had an enrollment of 1,006 students and 82.8 classroom teachers (on an FTE basis), for a student–teacher ratio of 12.1:1.

The Lakehurst district decided in 2012 against a proposal that would have had borough students attend Jackson Liberty High School as part of a sending / receiving relationship with the Jackson School District. The change in the sending relationship had been considered as a means of reducing the costs associated with paying $14,000 for each of the 150 students attending Manchester High School, as opposed to the $11,300 that would have been paid at Jackson, yielding annual savings of $400,000, less the added cost of transporting students to and from Jackson.

Transportation

Roads and highways

New Jersey Route 70 is the main highway through the borough, which lies at the western end of New Jersey Route 37. County Route 547 connects from the North after paralleling the eastern edge of the Lakehurst Maxfield Field portion of Joint Base McGuire-Dix-Lakehurst.

Public transportation
Ocean Ride local service is provided on the OC1A Whiting Express and the OC2 Manchester routes.

Lakehurst is located on the former Central Railroad of New Jersey Southern Division Main Line. The Barnegat Branch formerly extended from Lakehurst through Toms River and Beachwood down to Barnegat.

Lakehurst is being considered as the southern terminus of the planned NJ Transit Monmouth-Ocean-Middlesex Line, which would closely follow the CNJ line.

Media
The Asbury Park Press provides daily news coverage of the community as does WOBM-FM radio. The government of the borough provides columns and commentary to The Manchester Times, which is one of seven weekly papers from Micromedia Publications; founded in 1995, the company was headquartered on Union Avenue in the borough until late 2019 when they moved to the Lakehurst Circle Center.

Notable people

People who were born in, residents of, or otherwise closely associated with Lakehurst include:
 Thomas Barlow (1896–1983), one of the first professional basketball players, he was inducted as a member of the Basketball Hall of Fame in 1981
 Rich Croushore (born 1970), former Major League Baseball pitcher who was born in Lakehurst when his father served in the U.S. Navy
 James S. Denton (1951 - 2018), publisher and editor of World Affairs and the director of the World Affairs Institute
 Marty Jannetty (born 1962), professional wrestler, best known as one-half of The Rockers in the World Wrestling Federation
 Abel Kiviat (1892–1991), silver medalist in the men's 1,500 m event at the 1912 Summer Olympics
 Juice Newton (born 1952), Grammy Award-winning American pop music and country singer
 Richard Shindell (born 1960), folk singer / songwriter

References

External links

 
1921 establishments in New Jersey
Borough form of New Jersey government
Boroughs in Ocean County, New Jersey
Populated places established in 1921